Bhubaneswar Central (Madhya) is a Vidhan Sabha constituency of Khordha district, Odisha, India.

This constituency includes Ward No. 16 to 29 and 35 to 37 of Bhubaneswar.

Elected Members

Two elections were held between 2009 and 2014. Elected members from the Bhubaneswar Central constituency are:

2019: (112): Ananta Narayan Jena (BJD)
2014: (112): Bijaya Kumar Mohanty (BJD)
2009: (112): Bijaya Kumar Mohanty (BJD)

2019 Election Result

2014 Election Result

2009 Election Results

In 2009 election, Biju Janata Dal candidate Bijaya Kumar Mohanty defeated Bharatiya Janata Party candidate Biswabhusan Harichandan by a margin of 34,985 votes.

Notes

References

Assembly constituencies of Odisha
Khordha district